Year 127 (CXXVII) was a common year starting on Tuesday (link will display the full calendar) of the Julian calendar. At the time, it was known as the Year of the Consulship of Rufus and Squilla (or, less frequently, year 880 Ab urbe condita). The denomination 127 for this year has been used since the early medieval period, when the Anno Domini calendar era became the prevalent method in Europe for naming years.

Events

By place

Roman Empire 
 Emperor Hadrian returns to Rome, after a seven-year voyage to the Roman provinces. 
 Hadrian, acting on the advice of his proconsul of Asia, Gaius Minicius Fundanus, determines that Christians shall not be put to death without a trial.

India 
 Kanishka I starts to rule in the Kushan Empire (approximate date).

By topic

Religion 
 The philosopher Carpocrates rejects ownership of private property, as being un-Christian.
</onlyinclude>

Births 
 Zheng Xuan, Chinese politician, philosopher (d. 200)

Deaths 
 Plutarch, Greek historian and biographer (b. AD 46)
 Publius Metilius Nepos, Roman politician (b. AD 45)

References